, real name  or , born 5 March 1980, is Japanese actress and model.

Selected filmography 
 MPD Psycho (2000 TV)
 Visitor Q (2001)
 Strange Circus (2005)
 Manji (2006 remake)
 Tokyo Daigaku Monogatari (2006)
 Akai Tama (2015)
 Antiporno (2016)

References

External links 
 Personal webpage? 
 

Japanese actresses
Japanese female models
1980 births
Living people
Actors from Saga Prefecture
People from Imari, Saga
Models from Saga Prefecture